Volda is the administrative centre of the municipality of Volda, in Møre og Romsdal county, Norway.

The  village has a population (2018) of 6,433.

Volda is home to the municipal administration, municipal schools, and the regional hospital. Volda University College is located there; the college enrolls about 3,000 students and specializes in education of teachers, animators, documentarists, and journalists. Volda has a shopping center as well as some industry. Volda Church is located in the central part of the village. The local newspaper is Avisa Møre. The Søre Sunnmøre District Court and the Søre Sunnmøre prosti (church deanery) are based in the village of Volda.

The Ørsta–Volda Airport, Hovden, lies between the two villages of Volda and Ørsta, along the European route E39 highway which runs through both villages.  There are also ferry connections to villages across the Voldsfjorden, linking Volda northwest to Lauvstad and southwest to Folkestad.

Media gallery

References

Villages in Møre og Romsdal
Volda